Dorothy Ina Elgiva Dobbie  (born January 5, 1945) is a Canadian businesswoman and former politician. She served in the House of Commons of Canada from 1988 to 1993, as a member of the Progressive Conservative Party.

Dobbie was a publisher before entering political life, and was a founder of Association Publications Ltd. She was the first woman to serve as president of the Winnipeg Chamber of Commerce. In 1983, she was named Outstanding Business Citizen of the Year by the Manitoba Chamber of Commerce.

In 2012, Dobbie was awarded the Queen's Diamond Jubilee Medal for her contributions and achievements as a Canadian citizen.

Politics
Dobbie was elected to the House of Commons in the 1988 election, defeating Liberal candidate Allan Kaufman by 715 votes to win the federal riding of Winnipeg South. The Progressive Conservatives won a majority government in the election, and Dobbie entered parliament as a government backbencher.

She served as parliamentary secretary to seven different ministers between 1989 and 1993, and was a member of fifteen committees. Dobbie acted as Co-Chair, alongside Claude Castonguay, on the Special Joint Committee on a Renewed Canada, and the committee's recommendations on constitutional reform later formed the basis of the government's 1992 Charlottetown Accord, which was defeated in a national referendum.

Dobbie supported Jean Charest's bid to succeed Prime Minister Brian Mulroney as Progressive Conservative leader in 1993 (Winnipeg Free Press, 11 June 1993), and retained her own nomination for the next federal election over a challenge from Charles Maximilian (Winnipeg Free Press, 16 March 1993).

The PC Party was resoundingly defeated in the 1993 election, losing all but two of its parliamentary seats. Dobbie lost her candidate's deposit, receiving 6,432 votes (12.29%) for a third-place finish against Liberal Reg Alcock. During the campaign, she accused the rival Reform Party of being controlled by Christian fundamentalists and criticized her own party for running advertisements that mocked Liberal leader Jean Chrétien's facial deformity (Winnipeg Free Press, 17 October 1993). She also called for the abolition of the Senate of Canada (Winnipeg Free Press, 18 July 1993).

After Charest's resignation as Progressive Conservative Party leader in 1998, she endorsed former prime minister Joe Clark to be his successor (Toronto Star, 29 June 1998).

Dobbie opposed the Progressive Conservative Party's merger with the Canadian Alliance in 2003, citing concern over unclear agendas of the new party, and she later endorsed Glen Murray, the former mayor of Winnipeg who ran as a Liberal candidate in the 2004 federal election in Charleswood—St. James—Assiniboia. When fellow Progressive Conservative Sinclair Stevens launched an ultimately unsuccessful lawsuit in an attempt to block the merger, Dobbie was one of eleven other party members who openly backed the Affidavit.

Post-political work 
Dobbie helped to found Pegasus Publications Inc. in 1996, and still serves as its president. She is now the publisher of Manitoba Gardener, Ontario Gardener and Alberta Gardener magazines, and has written several articles on gardening.

In 1997, Dobbie was appointed to the Canadian Broadcast Standards Council - Prairie Region.

In 2004, Dobbie was appointed a board member of Tree Canada. After she served as chair from 2008 to 2011, a Tree Canada news release announced that Dobbie was stepping down from the position.

Electoral history

References

External links
 

Members of the House of Commons of Canada from Manitoba
Progressive Conservative Party of Canada MPs
1945 births
Living people
Women members of the House of Commons of Canada
Women in Manitoba politics
Members of the Order of Canada
Politicians from Winnipeg